William Barrington was an Irish politician. He was an independent member of Seanad Éireann from 1922 to 1931. He was elected at the 1922 Seanad election and served until he lost his seat at the 1931 Seanad election.

References

Year of birth missing
Year of death missing
Independent members of Seanad Éireann
Members of the 1922 Seanad
Members of the 1925 Seanad
Members of the 1928 Seanad